Lhau is a village near Tawang town in Tawang district of Arunachal Pradesh

References

Villages in Tawang district